Echenbrunn Abbey was a Benedictine monastery located at Echenbrunn, now part of Gundelfingen an der Donau in Bavaria, Germany.

Dedicated to Saints Peter and Paul, the monastery was founded in 1122 by Gumbert von Flochberg, a local noble. It was dissolved in 1556 by order of Otto Henry, Elector Palatine. In 1672 the Jesuits from Dillingen built a summer residence on the site, which later became the property of the Order of Saint John. The present structure on the site is a parish priest's house with a gabled roof built in 1732. The enclosure wall and its gateway with a pointed arch appear to date from the 16th century.

See also
 List of Jesuit sites

References

Further reading
Alois Wagner, "Zur Geschichte des Klosters Echenbrunn" in Jahrbuch des Historischen Vereins Dillingen, vol. 9 (1896), pp. 251–252
Georg Rückert, "Die Äbte des Klosters Echenbrunn" in Jahrbuch des Historischen Vereins Dillingen, vol. 25 (1912), pp. 290–315
Anton Michael Seitz, "Über Siegel und Wappen der ehemaligen Abtei Echenbrunn" in Jahrbuch des Historischen Vereins Dillingen, vol. 67/68 (1965/66), pp. 85–88
Erich Stahleder, "Die verschollene Bibliothek des Benediktinerkloster Echenbrunn" in Jahrbuch des Historischen Vereins Dillingen, vol. 69 (1967), pp. 25–41

Benedictine monasteries in Germany
Monasteries in Bavaria
1120s establishments in the Holy Roman Empire
1122 establishments in Europe
1556 disestablishments in Europe
Religious organizations established in the 1120s
Christian monasteries established in the 12th century